This is a list of countries by population in 1700. Estimate numbers are from the beginning of the year and exact population figures are for countries that held a census on various dates in the 1700s. The bulk of these numbers are sourced from Alexander V. Avakov's Two Thousand Years of Economic Statistics, Volume 1, pages 18 to 20, which cover population figures from the year 1700 divided into modern borders. Avakov, in turn, cites a variety of sources, mostly Angus Maddison.

See also
List of countries by population
List of countries by population in 1000
List of countries by population in 1500
List of countries by population in 1600
List of countries by population in 1800
List of countries by population in 1900
List of countries by population in 2000
List of countries by population in 2005

Notes

References

Kurt Witthauer. Bevölkerung der Erde (1958)
Calendario atlante de Agostini, anno 99 (2003)
The Columbia gazetteer of the world (1998)
Britannica book of the year : world data (1997)

1700
1700